Joan Acocella (née Ross, born 1945) is an American journalist who is a staff writer for The New Yorker. She has written books on dance, literature, and psychology.

Education and career
Acocella received her B.A. in English in 1966 from the University of California, Berkeley. She earned a Ph.D. in comparative literature at Rutgers University in 1984 with a thesis on the Ballets Russes.

Acocella has written for The Village Voice, has served as a senior critic and the reviews editor for Dance Magazine, and was the New York dance critic for the Financial Times. Her writing also appears regularly in the New York Review of Books. She began writing for The New Yorker in 1992 and served as its dance critic from 1998 to 2019.

Her books include Creating Hysteria: Women and Multiple Personality Disorder (1999); Mark Morris (1993), a biography of modern dancer and choreographer Mark Morris; and Twenty-Eight Artists and Two Saints (2007), which explores the virtues common among extraordinary artists. She also edited The Diary of Vaslav Nijinsky: Unexpurgated Edition (1999), André Levinson on Dance (1991), and Mission to Siam: The Memoirs of Jessie MacKinnon Hartzell (2001), her grandmother.

Acocella's New Yorker article "Cather and the Academy," which appeared in the November 27, 1995 issue, received a Front Page Award from the Newswomen's Club of New York and was included in the “Best American Essays” anthology of 1996. She expanded the essay into Willa Cather and the Politics of Criticism (2000).

A 2012 review by Acocella of Henry Hitchings's The Language Wars drew criticism from Jan Freeman and Mark Liberman. John McIntyre of The Baltimore Sun wrote about the episode in an opinion column.

Bibliography

Awards and honors
2017 – Harold D. Vursell Memorial Award, American Academy of Arts and Letters
2017 – Fellow, Dorothy and Lewis B. Cullman Center for Scholars and Writers
2012 – Holtzbrinck Berlin Prize Fellow, American Academy in Berlin.
2009 – Nona Balakian Citation for Excellence in Reviewing, the National Book Critics Circle
2007 – Award in Literature, American Academy of Arts and Letters
2002–present – Fellow, New York Institute for the Humanities
1993–1994 – Fellow, Guggenheim Foundation.

References

1945 births
Living people
American dance critics
Dance in New York City
The New Yorker critics
American women journalists
American women critics
The Village Voice people
20th-century American journalists
20th-century American women writers
21st-century American journalists
21st-century American women writers
Tisch School of the Arts alumni